Atelopus seminiferus is a species of toad in the family Bufonidae.
It is endemic to Peru.
Its natural habitats are subtropical or tropical moist montane forests and rivers.

References

seminiferus
Amphibians of Peru
Amphibians described in 1874
Taxonomy articles created by Polbot